

Men's 100 m Freestyle - Final

Men's 100 m Freestyle - Semifinals

Men's 100 m Freestyle - Semifinal 01

Men's 100 m Freestyle - Semifinal 02

Men's 100 m Freestyle - Heats

Men's 100 m Freestyle - Heat 01

Men's 100 m Freestyle - Heat 02

Men's 100 m Freestyle - Heat 03

Men's 100 m Freestyle - Heat 04

Men's 100 m Freestyle - Heat 05

Men's 100 m Freestyle - Heat 06

Swimming at the 2006 Commonwealth Games